Camptodactyly, tall stature, and hearing loss syndrome, also known as CATSHL syndrome, is a rare genetic disorder which consists of camptodactyly, tall height, scoliosis, and hearing loss. Occasionally, developmental delay and intellectual disabilities are reported. About 30 (live) people with the disorder have been recorded in medical literature to date (May 2022); 27 people from a four-generation Utah family and 2 brothers from consanguineous Egyptian parents. This disorder is caused by autosomal dominant missense mutations in the FGFR3 gene.

References 

Genetic diseases and disorders
Hearing loss